Advanzia Bank is a European digital bank based in Munsbach, Luxembourg. It offers no-fee credit cards and deposit accounts for private customers. Its service portfolio also contains co-branded credit cards and credit card solutions for business partners and other financial institutions, an area in which it is one of the largest actors in the market. Advanzia Bank is subject to the supervision of Luxembourg’s national financial supervisory authority.

History 
Advanzia Bank was founded at the initiative of former managers of the Norwegian Bankia Bank. The new company was issued a banking license by the Luxembourg Ministry of Finance in late 2005 and went on to launch its business operations in 2006. Advanzia Bank also entered the German market in the same year in a development seen as an example of the increasing competition between national and foreign financial institutions at that time.

Ever since its formation, Advanzia Bank has been a digital or virtual bank with no physical branches. It initially focused its activities on two products: a no-fee credit card and a deposit account as an investment option with an above-average interest rate. Both products attracted widespread media attention. Advanzia Bank overcame the 2007 global financial crisis without any major problems and went on to record its first profit in 2009.

From 2010 onwards, Advanzia Bank set out to make its business activities more international. This approach was made possible thanks to a European directive concerning the distance marketing of financial services, i.e., banking without branches in the target markets. The bank launched operations in France in 2012, Austria in 2015, Spain in 2019 and Italy in 2021. In 2018/2019, Advanzia Bank acquired the credit card solutions portfolio of the Swedish Catella Bank. Advanzia’s largest market is Germany, as confirmed by the number of issued credit cards.

Advanzia Bank rolled out mobile payments for its no-fee credit cards in 2020, for example via Google Pay. In addition to issuing credit cards from Mastercard, the bank now also has a corresponding license from Visa.

Corporate structure 
Advanzia Bank operates as a Société Anonyme (SA), a public limited company according to Luxembourg law. Its business purpose involves executing banking transactions, especially issuing credit cards, granting loans to credit card holders and handling cash deposits.

The company is subject to supervision of the Commission de Surveillance du Secteur Financier (CSSF), the supervisory authority of the Luxembourg financial sector. Advanzia Bank is a member of the Luxembourg Deposit Guarantee Fund (Fonds de garantie des dépôts Luxembourg, FGDL), which guarantees customer deposits up to a total of EUR 100,000 per person and institution.

Advanzia Bank is owned by private investors. The majority of its shares, a total of about 60%, have been owned by Norwegian company Kistefos since 2006, and they list Advanzia bank as a consolidated business in their financial statements. Bengt Arve Rem, Chief Executive Officer of Kistefos, is the Chairman of the Board of Directors of Advanzia Bank.

The Advanzia Bank Executive Management Committee consists of three members: Roland Ludwig (Chief Executive Officer, CEO), Kaj Larsen (General Counsel) and Patrick Thilges (Chief Financial Officer, CFO).

Products 
Advanzia Bank’s business model is based on the provision of credit cards, which are in turn primarily financed by funds deposited in its deposit accounts.

Advanzia Bank offers its customers mainly Mastercard credit cards with no annual fees. Its cardholders also do not pay any fees for cash withdrawals or when using their credit card abroad. Purchases made with the credit card have an interest-free payment term with an optional revolving loan facility.

Advanzia Bank also issues credit cards for other companies, which personalise the cards with their brands to use them as customer loyalty tools. It additionally offers outsourcing solutions for the credit cards of other financial institutions and private banks..

Advanzia Bank offers deposit accounts that are free of charge, and where no annual fees apply. An above-average interest rate that is not reduced in the case of higher deposits has been the defining factor of its deposit account service for many years. Interest is credited on a monthly basis.

See also 
 List of banks in Luxembourg

Notes and references

External links 
 Official website

Banks of Luxembourg